is a Japanese manga series written and illustrated by Akiko Higashimura. It was serialized in Kodansha's josei manga magazine Kiss from October 2008 to August 2017. The manga is licensed in North America by Kodansha USA. An 11-episode anime television adaptation directed by Takahiro Omori was produced by Brain's Base and aired on Fuji TV's Noitamina programming block between October and December 2010. The anime has been licensed by Funimation. A live-action film adaptation premiered in Japan on December 27, 2014. A ten-episode live-action drama series aired from January to March 2018.

Plot
Princess Jellyfish centers on Amamizukan, an apartment building in Tokyo, where the only tenants are otaku women, and where no men are allowed. While each character has her own particular fixation, the protagonist is Tsukimi Kurashita, whose love of jellyfish stems from memories of her deceased mother taking her to an aquarium and linking the lace-like tendrils of jellyfish to the dresses of princesses. Tsukimi hopes to become an illustrator and is an awkward girl terrified of social interaction, attractive people and the prospect of formal work.

The other tenants of Amamizukan are the same, being NEETs who refer to themselves as the "Sisterhood" (nuns). Tsukimi meets the stylish Kuranosuke Koibuchi, the illegitimate son of a politician, who cross-dresses to avoid the obligations of politics and to feel closer to his mother. Tsukimi keeps the secret of his masculinity from her man-hating housemates, even as she is troubled by the intimacy of having a man in her room at times.

Amamizukan's neighborhood is under threat of redevelopment, as opportunists aim to turn the quaint area into a more cosmopolitan region, with many of the buildings being demolished to make room for hotels and shopping centers. Although Amamizukan's tenants fear and loathe attractive people, they are helped by Kuranosuke who does not want to see Amamizukan destroyed.

Characters

Played by: Rena Nōnen (2014 film), Kyoko Yoshine (2018 show)
Tsukimi, age 18-19 years old, is nerdy girl who lives in Tokyo who wants to be an illustrator. Influenced by her late mother, she has a love for all kinds of jellyfish and is quite knowledgeable about them. She is the only resident of Amamizukan who knows Kuranosuke's true gender. Like the other Sisters, she has a fear of stylish people and will usually petrify in their presence. Tsukimi has a pet spotted jellyfish named Clara. Much to her chagrin, she often receives temporary makeovers from Kuranosuke; in these states, she becomes beautiful and Shū falls for her. She reciprocates Shū's feelings but she is led to think that he is in love with Shōko Inari. She grows to be very comfortable around Kuranosuke when he is cross-dressing to the point she nearly forgets his gender, but conversely she gets very nervous whenever he is in his "boy" state in front of her.

Played by: Masaki Suda (2014 film), Koji Seto (2018 show)
Kuranosuke is the son of a rich political family. He uses the alias "Kurako" in front of the other Sisters to hide his gender. He enjoys cross-dressing, to the chagrin of his family. Unlike the rest of his family, he does not find politics interesting at all and desires to get into fashion. He is constantly looking for the address of his mother, who gave birth to him after having an affair with his father, hoping to see at least once more the wardrobe she kept with so much passion. After meeting Tsukimi and helping her rescue Clara from a pet store, he starts paying her visits, finding her more interesting than anything else in his life. Throughout his life he has been popular with pretty girls, thus he almost cannot believe it when he starts realizing he may have feelings for Tsukimi.

Played by: Azusa Babazono (2014 film), Eriko Tomiyama (2018 show)
Chieko is one of the Sisterhood who is the manager of Amamizukan. She is obsessed with dressing in traditional Japanese clothes, such as in a kimono, and collects traditional Japanese dolls. Her mother is the owner of the building, but is rarely present as she is a groupie of Bae Yong-joon. Chieko is the only Sisterhood member who never receives a makeover from Kuranosuke, on the grounds that wearing traditional Japanese clothing in the middle of Tokyo makes her fashionable to begin with. Due to her interests, Chieko is an excellent seamstress.

Played by: Rina Ōta (2014 film), Rio Uchida (2018 show)
Mayaya is one of the Sisterhood who is obsessed with Records of the Three Kingdoms. She makes constant references to events of that time, tends to be overly excited, and shouts when she speaks.

Played by: Chizuru Ikewaki (2014 film), Rena Matsui (2018 show)
Banba is one of the Sisterhood who is obsessed with all kinds of trains. Her large "afro" hair is natural. She can accurately judge the quality of food just by looking at it, an ability referred to in the anime as the "Banba scope." She claims to be eight years old, due to her being born on a leap year, putting her chronological age between 32 and 35.

Played by: Tomoe Shinohara (2014 film), Haruka Kinami (2018 show)
Jiji is one of the Sisterhood who is obsessed with mature, old men. She tends to blend into the background and is constantly afraid of falling ill.

Played by: Hiroki Hasegawa (2014 film), Asuka Kudoh (2018 show)
Shū is Kuranosuke's 30-year-old half-brother and a personal assistant to their father. Due to catching his father cheating with Kuranosuke's mother at a young age, he has a phobia of women. However, after first seeing Tsukimi all dressed up, he starts becoming attracted to her, though he initially cannot recognize her when she wears her regular clothes.

Played by: Nana Katase (2014 film), Rika Izumi (2018 show)
A real estate developer who plans to turn the Amamizukan into a high-rise hotel. She manipulates Shū, spiking his drink with sedatives at a bar and makes him believe they had sex so she can blackmail him into getting in good relations with his father.

Played by: Kenichi Takitō (2018 show)
Mejiro is a popular writer of yaoi manga, treated with great reverence by the other Sisters. Due to her anthropophobia and nocturnal habits she is barricaded in her room and has only been seen a few times by Chieko. Her only communication with the Sisterhood are sheets of paper slipped under her door, and the Sisterhood has developed a ritual of preparing questions for Mejiro and slipping them to her. Sometimes she has the Sisterhood help her out with her manga, especially near deadlines. Unlike the other Sisters who are simply nervous around or have no interest in men, Mejiro has a very strong dislike of men. However, it is revealed at the end of the manga that Mejiro is actually a guy. He has deep affections for Chieko and declares that men should be banned from Amamizukan because he did not want other men to fall for Chieko. Unfortunately, this backfired and he could not leave his room as a result.

Played by: Mokomichi Hayami (2014 film), Jun Kaname (2018 show)
Hanamori is the Koibuchi family's chauffeur and a childhood friend of Shū. He's a Mercedes-Benz enthusiast and easily caves under pressure, bribery, or requests from people with an afro. A smooth-talker who loves to flirt, he's more self-centered than not despite a solid streak of decency. He bears the distinction of being the only male allowed freely in and out of Amamizukan.

Played by: Mayumi Wakamura (2018 show)
Kuranosuke's biological mother. She used to be a stage actress, but became Keiichirō's lover and became pregnant with Kuranosuke. After giving birth, she and Kuranosuke lived together, but Keiichirō separated them. She is currently living with an Italian man in Italy. When she received an email from a friend with a video of Kuranosuke attached, she contacted Shū, but told him not to tell Kuranosuke.

Tsukumi's pet spotted jellyfish. She is kept in a tank on the floor of Amamizukan. She was saved by Tsukimi and Kuranosuke when she was in mortal danger after being carelessly put together with an Aurelia aurita at a pet store, and was the reason for their encounter with each other. Tsukimi seems to have paid a considerable amount of money to keep the jellyfish, including the aquarium and artificial seawater. Since she is a jellyfish, she doesn't do anything special, but she is a source of emotional support for Tsukimi. Tsukimi draws illustrations of anthropomorphic Clara and makes stuffed animals based on her, which is how Tsukimi's sense of style caught the attention of Kuranosuke. The anthropomorphic Clara is the mascot character of the story, providing commentary throughout the chapters, and in the anime adaptation, she is also featured on the eyecatch cards. She usually speaks in a respectful tone, but when dealing with jellyfish, she takes on a friendlier tone.

Media

Manga
Written and illustrated by Akiko Higashimura, Princess Jellyfish was serialized in Kodansha's josei manga magazine Kiss from October 25, 2008, to August 25, 2017. Kodansha collected its chapters in 17 tankōbon volumes, released from March 13, 2009 to November 13, 2017. Kodansha USA licensed and released the manga in North America in nine omnibus editions from March 22, 2016 to June 5, 2018. Crunchyroll also added the manga to its web distribution service. The manga is licensed by Star Comics in Italy, and Akata in France.

Volume list

Anime
An 11-episode anime television series adaptation produced by Brain's Base, directed by Takahiro Omori, and written by Jukki Hanada aired in Japan between October 15 and December 31, 2010 on Fuji Television's Noitamina programming block. Character designs were provided by Kenji Hayama and the music was composed by Makoto Yoshimori. Prior to the anime, a mini-anime version called  was broadcast in August of the same year. It had nothing to do with the main storyline, but rather depicted the adventures of the Sisterhood as they explored the jungle. Four BD/DVD compilation volumes were released from January to April 2011, and each volume contained a bonus anime short called Princess Jellyfish - Heroes that focused on each of the Sisterhood members. Actor Takeo Chii makes a special appearance in the anime as Jiji's beloved goods (posters, etc.), and is also listed in the ending credits. In addition, the son of the original author, Akiko Higashimura (nicknamed Gocchan), makes a brief appearance as a background character in episode 8.

Funimation simulcasted the series on its video streaming website as part of their deal with Fuji TV; the first two episodes premiered on October 28, 2010. Funimation later licensed the series in North America in response to positive feedback from a fan survey posted on their Facebook page and released the series on BD/DVD on February 28, 2012. The series made its North American television debut on September 11, 2012 on the Funimation Channel.

Episode list

Live-action
A live-action film adaptation produced by Asmik Ace Entertainment premiered in Japanese theaters on December 27, 2014. The film is directed by Taisuke Kawamura and the script is written by Toshiya Ono.

A 10-episode live-action drama series adaptation aired on Fuji TV from January 15 to March 19, 2018. The drama is directed by Junichi Ishikawa and the script is written by Yuuichi Tokunaga.

Reception
In 2010, Princess Jellyfish won the Kodansha Manga Award for best shōjo manga. It was also nominated for the Manga Taishō Award that year. In 2017, it was nominated for the Eisner Award in the "Best U.S. Edition of International Material—Asia" category, for its first three volumes.

It was reported in August 2010 that over 1 million copies of the manga have been sold. During their first week of sales, the fourth volume of the manga sold about 27,000 copies, and the fifth volume sold about 55,000 copies. The sixth volume sold over 60,000 copies in its first week, and exceeded 100,000 copies sold in total the week after.

Princess Jellyfish has been considered one of the best anime of the 2010s by Polygon. Julia Lee highlighted its message of "Everyone is beautiful and interesting and it should be a crime to not see yourself that way". Writing for Forbes, Lauren Orsini considered it to be one of the five best anime of 2010; she wrote, "Part coming-of-age story, part Project Runway design challenge, this sweet romantic comedy explores gender identity in a way that still feels observant and fresh". Crunchyroll staff also included it in such a list; reviewer Kara Dennison praised "its charming art to its heartfelt story" and said, "Princess Jellyfish is one of those rare precious gems that doesn't depict female otaku-dom as unicorn-rare, but digs into what it really feels like to be a young woman in that walk of life".

References

External links

 
 
Live-action film official website 
 

ANN box set review

2008 manga
2010 Japanese television series debuts
2010 Japanese television series endings
2018 Japanese television series debuts
2018 Japanese television series endings
Brain's Base
Coming-of-age anime and manga
Cross-dressing in anime and manga
Funimation
Fuji TV dramas
Japanese romantic comedy television series
Japanese television dramas based on manga
Josei manga
Kodansha manga
Manga adapted into films
Noitamina
Romantic comedy anime and manga
Slice of life anime and manga
Winner of Kodansha Manga Award (Shōjo)
Japanese romantic comedy films